This partial list of city nicknames in Rhode Island compiles the aliases, sobriquets and slogans that cities, towns, and villages in Rhode Island are known by (or have been known by historically), officially and unofficially, to municipal governments, local people, outsiders or their tourism boards or chambers of commerce. City nicknames can help in establishing a civic identity, helping outsiders recognize a community or attracting people to a community because of its nickname; promote civic pride; and build community unity. Nicknames and slogans that successfully create a new community "ideology or myth" are also believed to have economic value. Their economic value is difficult to measure, but there are anecdotal reports of cities that have achieved substantial economic benefits by "branding" themselves by adopting new slogans.

Some unofficial nicknames are positive, while others are derisive. Many of the unofficial nicknames listed here have been in use for a long time or have gained wide currency.
East Providence - EP
Galilee (in the town of Narrangansett) – Tuna Capital of the World
Newport
America's First Resort
City by the Sea
Sailing Capital of the World
Pawtucket – The Bucketthebucketri.com : "'The Bucket', intended as a derogatory knick-name for the city of Pawtucket, has been embraced by locals..."
Providence
America's Renaissance City or The Renaissance CityProvidence needs a new brand name  by Mark Faverman, Providence Journal, December 24, 2006, accessed January 5, 2008. "Previous names like the Beehive of Industry and Renaissance City have not captured the public’s imagination and have failed to convey the right tone or uniqueness."
Beehive of Industry
The Creative Capital
PVD
"Prov"
Warwick – Crossroads of Rhode Island
"Cranston but with a Trader Joe's"
Woonsocket – Woony

See also
 List of city nicknames in the United States
List of municipalities in Rhode Island

References

.Nicknames
Rhode Island cities and towns
City nicknames